Sydney Montague Jacob (28 October 1879 – 14 February 1977) was an Anglo-Indian tennis player who represented India at the Davis Cup and Olympic Games. He competed in the singles event at the 1924 Summer Olympics, reaching the quarterfinal in which he lost to Jean Borotra. With compatriot Mohammed Sleem he competed in the men's doubles event and reached the second round. He also competed in the mixed doubles event, with compatriot Nora Polley, but lost their first match in the second round after a bye in the first round. Jacob reached the semi finals at the French championships in 1925, where he beat Jacques Brugnon and Andre Gobert, before losing to René Lacoste.

He published an autobiographical book titled Favour for Fools in a Decadent Empire: A Skeletal Autobiography.

References

External links
 
 Website bio

1879 births
1977 deaths
Anglo-Indian people
People from Solan district
Indian male tennis players
Olympic tennis players of India
Tennis players at the 1924 Summer Olympics
Indian emigrants to England
British people of Anglo-Indian descent